Väinö Johannes Merivirta (16 July 1892 – 20 November 1937; original surname Sjöström) was a Finnish lawyer and politician, born in Pori. He was a member of the Parliament of Finland from 1935 to 1936, representing the National Progressive Party.

References

1892 births
1937 deaths
People from Pori
People from Turku and Pori Province (Grand Duchy of Finland)
National Progressive Party (Finland) politicians
Members of the Parliament of Finland (1933–36)
University of Helsinki alumni